Judgment Night is the soundtrack to the 1993 film of the same name. It was released on September 14, 1993 through Immortal Records and Epic Soundtrax and was produced by many of the album's performers. Every song on the soundtrack was a collaboration between hip-hop artists and rock artists. The album peaked at #17 on the Billboard 200 and spawned four singles, "Fallin'" by Teenage Fanclub and De La Soul, "Another Body Murdered" by Faith No More and Boo-Yaa T.R.I.B.E., "Just Another Victim" by Helmet and House of Pain, and "Judgment Night" by Biohazard and Onyx.

Production and release
Billboard explains that the soundtrack album "paired hip-hop artists with modern rock acts," and The A.V. Club wrote that its musical pairings were "designed to capitalize on the burgeoning popularity of rap-rock." A.V. Club further opines that although there had been "sporadic successful mergers" between individual artists in the metal and rap genres by 1993, "no one had yet thought to do an entire album based on getting established rap and rock artists in the same studio to hash something out. That revolutionary concept in doubling your market share fell to Happy Walters." According to Rolling Stone, "it is largely due to the initiative of [soundtrack producer] Happy Walters... that so many leading hip-hop and alternative artists were assembled for the soundtrack," with Walters bringing in groups such as Pearl Jam, Boo-Yaa T.R.I.B.E., Sonic Youth, Cypress Hill, and Faith No More as collaborators on new material. The Judgment Night soundtrack album was released by Immortal Records with distribution by Epic Records.

According to DJ Muggs of Cypress Hill, Faith No More, Helmet and Sonic Youth were the first bands to show interest in the project. He recalled, "Sonic Youth, Helmet, their managers were super supportive. Helmet were super into it. Faith No More was really into it. Those three, I think, were the first ones to come onboard, which were all credible and cool at the time. Which really helped with others."  A collaboration between Tool and Rage Against the Machine on the song "Can't Kill the Revolution" was attempted for the album, but neither band was happy with the results.  The song has never been officially released, but has spread through fan bootleg networks.

Reception

Rolling Stone said of the soundtrack, "Judgment Night'''s bracing rap rock is like the wedding of hillbilly and 'race' music that started the whole thing in the first place....It's an aspiring re-birth". Entertainment Weekly said they "can't vouch for the film, but the album is a MUST". Q Magazine said the soundtrack "suggests that the future for both metal and rap as a kind of agit prop soapbox style is secure".

Score album

Intrada released a CD of Alan Silvestri's score for the film. Musician said of the score, "Tear down a few walls and it's amazing what tumbles out".

Track listing

Certifications

References

External links
Oral History of the ‘Judgment Night’ Soundtrack: 1993’s Rap-Rock Utopia from Rolling Stone''

Action film soundtracks
Rap rock soundtracks
1993 soundtrack albums
Epic Records soundtracks
Immortal Records albums